1968 Emperor's Cup Final was the 48th final of the Emperor's Cup competition. The final was played at National Stadium in Tokyo on January 1, 1969. Yanmar Diesel won the championship.

Overview
Yanmar Diesel won their 1st title, by defeating Mitsubishi Motors 1–0.

Match details

See also
1968 Emperor's Cup

References

Emperor's Cup
Emperor's Cup Final
Emperor's Cup Final
Emperor's Cup Final
Cerezo Osaka matches
Urawa Red Diamonds matches